Ahmed Beg Fatah Beg Ibrahim Beg Mahmud Beg or Hamdi (حەمدی in Kurdish), (1876–1936), was a Kurdish poet.

References

1876 births
1936 deaths
Kurdish-language poets
Kurdish poets
People from Sulaymaniyah
Iraqi poets
Poets from the Ottoman Empire